Edgar Powell (6 January 1899 – 1955) was a Welsh footballer who played in the Football League for Accrington Stanley, Barrow, Merthyr Town and Stoke.

Career
Powell was born in Cardiff and played for Barry Town and Denaby United before joining Huddersfield Town. He left Huddersfield having never made an appearance and played twice for Stoke in 1924–25. He enjoyed a better time at Accrington Stanley scoring 17 league goals in 65 matches. Powell then had short spells with Merthyr Town and Barrow.

Career statistics
Source:

References

Welsh footballers
Accrington Stanley F.C. (1891) players
Denaby United F.C. players
Barrow A.F.C. players
Merthyr Town F.C. players
Stoke City F.C. players
English Football League players
1899 births
1955 deaths
Association football forwards